Vandy can refer to:

People
 Vandy Hampton, a former member of the Chi-Lites R&B/soul vocal quartet
 Vandy Kaonn (born 1942), Cambodian history and literature analyst and author
 Khek Vandy (Khek being the surname), Cambodian politician elected the National Assembly of Cambodia in 2003
 Vandy Rattana (born 1980), Cambodian photographer and artist 
 Peter Vandy, 20th-21st century politician in Sierra Leone
 Vanessa Vandy (born 1989), New Zealand-born Finnish retired pole vaulter
 Benjamin H. Vandervoort (1917–1990), US Army officer in World War II
 Machiel van den Heuvel (1900–1946), Dutch World War II prisoner of war known as "Vandy" by his British fellow POWs at Colditz Castle
 Paul Vandy, stage name of juggler Charles Edward Maynard (c. 1874–1950)

Other uses
 The colloquial name for Vanderbilt University
 Vandy, Ardennes, a commune in northern France
 The sports teams of the Vandercook Lake, Michigan, school district
 Solomon Vandy, a character in the film Blood Diamond

See also
 Vandi, a surname

Lists of people by nickname